Our Generation Speaks (OGS) is a fellowship program and startup incubator whose mission is to bring together young Israeli and Palestinian leaders through entrepreneurship.  OGS works in partnership with the Heller School for Social Policy and Management (Brandeis University)  and MassChallenge to give OGS Fellows the tools to develop businesses that generate significant social and economic value in the Middle East.

Structure 
OGS teaches business development, financial management, marketing strategy, and conflict-resolution to young adults aged 21–30. The fellowship runs over the course of three months in Waltham, Massachusetts, and includes daily classes taught by Brandeis University professors, one-on-one mentoring, and workshops. During the summer, the fellows work in teams to build sustainable businesses that will benefit their home communities. The fellowship operates entirely in English and provides each group of fellows with the skills and network to enact change in their communities. Each business developed through OGS receives seed funding at the end of the fellowship to aid in their launch and operations upon return to Israel and Palestine.

OGS Fellows remain connected through the OGS Alumni Organization, which plans a number of annual activities, including group trips in Israel and Palestine, meetings with local leaders, and trainings focused on career and leadership development. The organization will host an annual conference for current fellowship participants and the growing group of alumni over time.

The OGS Fellows are exceptional young adults from both Israel and Palestine. OGS uses entrepreneurship to bring together people from these communities, which in turn works toward building trust and enacting social and economic change. Each year, OGS aims to maintain a 1:1 ratio of Israeli and Palestinians, as well as female and male fellows.

The fellowship is fully funded for the fellows.

History 
Our Gеnеrаtіоn Speaks wаѕ fоundеd by Brandeis University student Ohad Elhelo in 2014. Since its founding, OGS has received financial support and advising from оvеr fіftу independent American, Pаlеѕtіnіаn, and Iѕrаеlі dоnоrѕ whо ѕhаrе its gоаlѕ and vаluеѕ, including the Kraft Family (the Kraft Group), former Governor of Massachusetts Deval Patrick, Hаnі Alаmі, a Palestinian telecommunications еntrерrеnеur, and Aron Ain, сhіеf еxесutіvе of Kronos Incorporated. Former Governor Deval Patrick currently serves as the Chairman of the OGS Advisory Board, alongside Robert Kraft who serves as Honorary Chairman.

Our Gеnеrаtіоn Sреаkѕ has since lаunсhеd thrее ѕtаrtuрѕ in Jеruѕаlеm & Rаmаllаh as of September 2016, and expects to launch at least three to four each year. Each OGS startup receives seed funding from OGS to establish themselves in Israel and Palestine. Some of the startups have also raised funds independently of OGS.

In February 2017, three OGS Fellows were featured on Forbes Israel's "Forbes 30 Under 30" list for their achievements.

In March 2017, Richard Behar wrote a feature-length article about OGS for Forbes, featuring OGS Alumni and network members.

In May 2017, OGS was one of two winners of the SBANE Innovation Awards in the Non-profit Category.

See also

 Middle East
 Israeli-Palestinian Conflict
 Projects working for peace among Arabs and Israelis
 Cross-cultural communication
 Social Entrepreneurship

References

External links 
Official Website

Human rights organizations based in the United States
Entrepreneurship organizations
International development agencies
Economic development organizations